Franz Hermann Schultz Ramírez (born 20 July 1991) is a Chilean professional footballer who plays as a midfielder or full-back for Argentine side Cipolletti.

Career
In the 2023 season, Schultz move abroad by first time in his career and joined Argentine club Cipolletti in the Torneo Federal A.

References

External links
 
 

1991 births
Living people
Chilean people of German descent
Sportspeople from Valparaíso
Chilean footballers
Chilean expatriate footballers
Primera B de Chile players
Chilean Primera División players
Santiago Wanderers footballers
Universidad de Chile footballers
O'Higgins F.C. footballers
C.D. Antofagasta footballers
Deportes Iquique footballers
A.C. Barnechea footballers
Torneo Federal A players
Club Cipolletti footballers
Chilean expatriate sportspeople in Argentina
Expatriate footballers in Argentina
Association football midfielders
Association football fullbacks